Benapur High School (H.S) is a secondary and higher secondary school located at Kharagpur, West Bengal, India. Its name is sometimes spelled "Banapur". The school was established in 1961 by the West Bengal state government. It provides science and arts education. The school is affiliated with the West Bengal Board of Secondary Education (WBBSE).

References 

High schools and secondary schools in West Bengal
Schools in Paschim Medinipur district
Kharagpur
Educational institutions established in 1961
1961 establishments in West Bengal